The St. Louis Vipers are a professional roller hockey team based in St. Louis, Missouri.

History 

The original team was a part of the now-defunct Roller Hockey International League. They played their home games in the former St. Louis Arena, but moved to the Kiel Center in 1995. The ownership of the club was led by former NHL star Bernie Federko, who also served as the head coach.

Over their six-year existence in the 90s, the St. Louis Vipers had a total home attendance of 332,412 in 71 home games, an average of 4,682 per game. The largest home crowd in Vipers history was the final regular season home game in 1997 with an announced attendance of over 14,000 against the New Jersey Rockin' Rollers.

They were the Murphy Cup champions in 1999, the final year of the RHI's existence.

The last official sporting event played at the St. Louis Arena was on August 16, 1994 versus the Tampa Bay Tritons in front of 11,146, the second largest Vipers home crowd.

The St. Louis Vipers hosted the 1995 RHI All-Star Game on July 15, 1995 in front of 9,166 at Kiel Center. The East beat the West with a score of 14-12. Ed Anderson of the East was the game's MVP.

Vipers 2.0 
A press conference was held on June 4, 2019 at Family Arena in St. Charles, MO announcing the return of the St. Louis Vipers. The National Roller Hockey League announced the team along with the Vipers head coach, Perry Turnbull. Turnbull played in 608 NHL games and had 351 career points. He also coached the St. Louis Vipers of the RHI from 1993-99 seasons. The league canceled their 2020 season due to COVID but had a 2021 plan in place. As of May 2021, the NRHL has made no public comments since early 2020 regarding any attempted comeback and any information on the league has not been answered on any of their social media outlets regarding a season or any refunds to any season tickets holders stuck who paid up front.

Yearly records

Team records

References

External links 
St. Louis Vipers website

Defunct sports teams in Missouri
Roller Hockey International teams
Vipers
Sports clubs established in 1993
Sports clubs disestablished in 1999
1993 establishments in Missouri
1999 disestablishments in Missouri